Barton Island is a small island in the Connecticut River, near Barton Cove, in Gill, Massachusetts, USA. The island is southeast of Riverside (neighborhood) and far southwest of the Chappell Drive & Mohawk Trail road (Route 2) intersection.

The island is heavily forested in three separate sections of the island. These three separate sections of the islands are connected by possible runoff sediment and/or other form of soil.

Islands of Franklin County, Massachusetts
River islands of Massachusetts
Islands of Massachusetts
Uninhabited islands of Massachusetts